James Mark Minahan (1872 – 11 October 1941) was an Irish-born Australian politician.

Born in County Clare to bootmaker Patrick Minahan and Mary Murphy, Minahan migrated to New South Wales around 1883 and partnered with his brother Patrick as a boot manufacturer. Around 1900 he married Mary Eileen Killeen, with whom he had four children. From 1925 to 1934 he served as a Labor Party  member of the New South Wales Legislative Council; he opposed Jack Lang in the 1930s and sat as a  Federal Labor representative. Minahan died at  Waverley in 1941.

References

1872 births
1941 deaths
Australian Labor Party members of the Parliament of New South Wales
Members of the New South Wales Legislative Council